Lal Jose is an Indian director, actor, producer and distributor who works in the Malayalam film industry. He started his career as an Assistant director in the Malayalam cinema. His directorial debut was with the 1998 film Oru Maravathoor Kanavu.

Lal Jose started his film career as an assistant director to Kamal. Lal Jose worked on a slew of Kamal's films during the 1990s. His popular films include Chandranudikkunna Dikhil (1999), Meesa Madhavan (2002), Chanthupottu (2005),  Classmates (2006), Arabikkatha (2007),  Neelathaamara (2009), Diamond Necklace (2012), Ayalum Njanum Thammil (2012), Immanuel (2013), and Vikramadithyan (2014).

Early life 
Born in Valapad in Thrissur, Kerala to Jose and Lilly, Lal Jose did his schooling at NSS KPT School and NSS College, Ottapalam. He is married to Leena. The couple have two daughters, Irene and Catherine. After completing his degree, he left for Chennai, with an aim of getting into movies. He got into the world of cinema by assisting noted director Kamal. He worked with Kamal in 16 films, from Pradheshika Varthakkal to Krishnagudiyil Oru Pranayakalathu. He worked as associate director to prominent filmmakers like Thampy Kannamthanam, Lohithadas, Harikumar, Vinayan, K. K. Haridas, and Nizar.

Film career 
In 1998, he made his debut as an independent director with Oru Maravathoor Kanavu, which starred Mammootty and was scripted by Sreenivasan. Producer Siyad Koker asked Lal Jose to direct a film for him. The film Oru Maravathoor Kanavu was a success for him.

In 2002 Lal Jose, teaming up with screenwriter Ranjan Pramod, who had earlier scripted Randaam Bhavam, came up with Meesa Madhavan, which was a milestone in his career along with that of Dileep. Meesa Madhavan was a hit and established Dileep in the industry. But Lal Jose proved his critics wrong in the year 2005 with Chanthupottu, starring Dileep. The box-office success of Chanthupottu took Lal Jose's career to new heights. In 2006, Lal Jose directed Achanurangatha Veedu, a low-budget film, which failed to bring audiences to the movie halls, though it won critical appreciation.

In 2006, Jose's film Classmates was released without much publicity, with no big stars, but became the highest-grossing film in Malayalam, until its record was broken by Twenty:20 two years later. In 2007, he did Arabikkatha, with Sreenivasan in a leading role. Arabikkatha was critically and commercially a big hit. His next movie was Mulla, starring Dileep. In 2009, Lal Jose directed Neelathamara, written by M. T. Vasudevan Nair, which was a remake of the 30-year-old movie with the same name. It was accepted well by the critics and the masses. He directed a story with Mammootty as lead in Kerala Cafe in 2010. He then directed the hit film Elsamma Enna Aankutty without multistars. In 2011, he became a judge on a reality show on Surya TV called Vivel Active Fair Big Break, where the winner would be the heroine in his next movie.

Awards
Kerala state film awards
2006: Best Popular Film – Classmates
2005: Kerala state film awards for Second Best Film  – Achanurangatha Veedu
2012: Best Director- Ayalum Njanum Thammil
2012: Best Popular Film- Ayalum Njanum Thammil

South Indian International Movie Awards
2013: Best Director for Ayalum Njanum Thammil
2013: Nominated—Best Film for Diamond Necklace

Asianet Film Awards
2007: Best Director Award for Arabikkatha

Ramu Karyat Awards
2010: Best Director Award for Elsamma Enna Aankutty

Asiavision Awards
 2013 – Asiavision Awards – Artistic Movie – Ayalum Njanum Thammil

Filmography

All films are in Malayalam language unless otherwise noted.

As director

As second unit or assistant director
 Meenathil Thalikettu (1998) (story and associate director)
 Krishnagudiyil Oru Pranayakalathu (1997) (assistant director)
 Bhoothakannadi (1997) (associate director)
 Manasam (1997) (assistant director)
 Azhakiya Ravanan (1996) (assistant director)
 Udyana Palakan (1996) (associate director)
 Mazhayethum Munpe (1995) (assistant director)
 Maanthrikam (1995) (associate director)
 Sudinam (1994) (associate director)
 Vadhu Doctoranu (1994) (associate director)
Bhoomi Geetham (1993) (assistant director)
 Champakulam Thachan (1992) (assistant director)
 Ennodishtam Koodamo (1992) (assistant director)
 Pookkalam Varavayi (1991) (assistant director)
 Ulladakkam (1991) (assistant director)
 Pradeshika Varthakal (1989) (assistant director)

Story
 Meenathil Thalikettu (1998)
 Chandranudikkunna Dikkil (1999)

As producer
 Diamond Necklace (2012) 
 Vikramadhithyan (2014) 
 Nee-Na (2015)
 Solamante Theneechakal (2022)

As distributor
 Thattathin Marayathu (2012)
 Theevram (2012)
 Diamond Necklace (2012)
 Neram (2013)
 Pullipulikalum Aattinkuttiyum (2013)
 Thira (2013)
 Ezhu Sundara Rathrikal (2013)
 1983 (2014)
 Homely meals (2014)
 Vikramadithyan (2014)
 KL.10 Pathu  (2015)
 Action Hero Biju  (2016)
 Jacobinte Swargarajyam (2016)
 Lens  (2016)
 Aanandam  (2016)
 Veeram (2017)

As actor
Bhoomi Geetham (1993)as Journalist
Sargavasantham (1995)
 Azhakiya Ravanan (1996) as Assistant Director
 Rock & Roll(2007) as himself
 Best Actor (2010) as himself
 Nadan (2010) as himself
 Ohm Shanthi Oshaana (2014) as Jacob Tharakan
 Oru Muthassi Gadha (2016) as himself
 Sunday Holiday (2017) as David Paul
 Kammara Sambhavam (2018) as himself
 Ente Mezhuthiri Athazhangal (2018) as Augustine Theodorus
 Ennaalum Sarath..? (2018) 
 Oru Nakshathramulla Aakasham (2019) as John Paul
 Mohabbathin Kunjabdulla (2019)
Varane Avashyamund (2020) as Sivaprasad
Gypsy  (2020) as Muthaleef
Kuttiyappanum Daivadootharum (2021) as himself
Nipah (2022)
Haya (2022) as Dr. Sai Nath

As Narrattor
 Vellimoonga (2014)

Television
2012 :Vivel Big Break (Surya TV) as Judge
2018 : Nayika Nayakan (Mazhavil Manorama) as Judge
2018 : Makkal (TV series) (Mazhavil Manorama) as himself
2019: Comedy Stars season 2 (asianet) as Judge
2022: Wife is Beautiful ( Zee Keralam) as promo voice over

Recurring collaborators
Music composer VidyaSagar has worked on 12 films out of Lal Jose's total 22 feature-length films. Sukumari had acted on 12 films, whereas Salim Kumar in 11 and Biju Menon in 9 and Dileep, Indrajith, Jagathy Sreekumar and Suraj Venjaramoodu were appeared on 7 films. Dubbing artiste Sreeja Ravi works as heroine voice for many films.

See also
List of films directed by Lal Jose featuring Vidyasagar

References

External links

Malayalam film directors
Malayali people
Living people
Filmfare Awards South winners
Malayalam film producers
Year of birth missing (living people)
Kerala State Film Award winners
Indian male film actors
20th-century Indian male actors
21st-century Indian male actors
20th-century Indian film directors
21st-century Indian film directors
Male actors from Thrissur
Male actors in Malayalam television
Male actors in Malayalam cinema
Male actors in Tamil cinema